There have been three baronetcies created for persons with the surname Lees, all in the Baronetage of the United Kingdom.

The Lees Baronetcy, of Blackrock in the County of Dublin, was created in the Baronetage of the United Kingdom on 30 June 1804 for the soldier and politician John Lees.

The Lees Baronetcy, of South Lytchett Manor in the parish of Lytchett Minster in the County of Dorset, was created in the Baronetage of the United Kingdom on 13 February 1897 for Elliott Lees. He represented Oldham and Birkenhead in the House of Commons as a Conservative. The third Baronet was a Colonel in the Army. The fourth Baronet served as High Sheriff of Dorset in 1960.

The Lees Baronetcy, of Longdendale in the County Palatine of Chester, was created in the Baronetage of the United Kingdom on 2 March 1937 for Sir Clare Lees. He notably served as Deputy Chairman of Martins Bank.

Lees baronets, of Blackrock (1804)

Sir John Lees, 1st Baronet (1737–1811)
Sir Harcourt Lees, 2nd Baronet (1776–1852)
Sir John Lees, 3rd Baronet (1816–1892)
Sir Harcourt James Lees, 4th Baronet (1840–1917)
Sir Arthur Henry James Lees, 5th Baronet (1863–1949)
Sir Jean Marie Ivor Lees, 6th Baronet (1875–1957)
Sir Charles Archibald Edward Ivor Lees, 7th Baronet (1902–1963)
Sir Thomas Harcourt Ivor Lees, 8th Baronet (born 1941)

Lees baronets, of South Lytchett Manor (1897)
Sir Elliott Lees, 1st Baronet, DSO (1860–1908)
Sir Thomas Evans Keith Lees, 2nd Baronet (1886–1915)
Sir John Victor Elliott Lees, 3rd Baronet DSO, MC (1887–1955)
Sir Thomas Edward Lees, 4th Baronet (1925–2016)
Sir Christopher James Lees, 5th Baronet (born 1952)

The heir apparent to the baronetcy is the current holder's eldest son John Austen Lees (born 1992).

Lees baronets, of Longdendale (1937)
Sir (William) Clare Lees, Kt., OBE, 1st Baronet (1874–1951)
Sir William Hereward Clare Lees, 2nd Baronet (1904–1976)
Sir (William) Antony Clare Lees, 3rd Baronet (born 1935)

There is no heir to the baronetcy.

See also
Leese baronets

References

Kidd, Charles, Williamson, David (editors). Debrett's Peerage and Baronetage (1990 edition). New York: St Martin's Press, 1990.

Lees